Lisa Hajjar is a professor of sociology at the University of California-Santa Barbara and editor of Jadaliyya.

Works

References

University of California, Santa Barbara faculty
Living people
Year of birth missing (living people)